is a stable of sumo wrestlers. Previous incarnations with this stable name have existed, with the last being headed by former yokozuna Nishinoumi, and which folded in 1933. The current incarnation is part of the Isegahama ichimon or group of stables. It was set up in February 2014 by former ōzeki Kaiō Hiroyuki (elder name Asakayama), who branched off from the Tomozuna stable. To begin with it had four wrestlers, two of whom he took with him from his former stable and two of whom were new recruits. In the May 2014 tournament, this stable had the distinction of being the only one where all of its wrestlers achieved kachi-koshi or a majority of wins. Kaito, the other Tomozuna transfer, won the makushita division championship in that tournament, but announced his retirement after the September 2020 tournament due to a neck injury. As of January 2023 it had nine wrestlers.

In September 2021 a 20-year-old member of the stable, Kaibushō, was arrested on charges of forcible indecency for soliciting nude images of an 11-year-old girl via LINE.

Owner
2014–present: 15th Asakayama (yakuin taigu iin, former ōzeki Kaiō Hiroyuki)

Notable active wrestlers
Kaishō (best rank, jūryō)

Usher
Kōji (makuuchi yobidashi, real name Takuma Hatano)

Hairdresser
Tokosei (1st class tokoyama)

Location and access
Tokyo, Sumida Ward, Midori 4-2-1
9 minute walk from Kinshichō Station on Sōbu Line (Rapid), Chūō-Sōbu Line, and Tokyo Metro Hanzōmon Line.

See also
List of sumo stables
List of active sumo wrestlers
List of past sumo wrestlers
Glossary of sumo terms

References

External links
Japan Sumo Association profile
Official website

Active sumo stables